is a railway station in Gose, Nara, Japan. Kintetsu Gose Station is located near the station.

Lines
  JR-West
  Wakayama Line

Platforms and tracks 
The station has 2 side platforms serving a track each.

Surroundings
Kintetsu Gose Station
Gose City Hall
Katsuragi Park
Gose Post Office
Gose Police Building (former Gose Police Station)
Gose Municipal Gose Elementary School
Gose Municipal Gose Junior High School

External links
 Official website 

Railway stations in Japan opened in 1891
Railway stations in Nara Prefecture